Daniel Pfeffer (born 27 April 1990) is a Czech male volleyball player. He is part of the Czech Republic men's national volleyball team. On club level he plays for VK Karlovarsko.

References

External links
Profile at FIVB.org

1990 births
Living people
Czech men's volleyball players
Sportspeople from Prague